John Dolyte or Tolite (fl. 1406–1433) of Chichester, Sussex, was an English politician.

He was a Member (MP) of the Parliament of England for Chichester in 1406, 1419, December 1421 and 1433.

References

14th-century births
15th-century deaths
English MPs 1406
People from Chichester
English MPs 1419
English MPs December 1421
English MPs 1433